The 1895 Washington football team was an American football team that represented the University of Washington during the 1895 college football season. The team compiled a 4–0–1 record, shut out three of five opponents, and outscored all opponents by a combined total of 98 to 8. Ralph Nichols, who had been the team captain in 1894, was the coach in 1895. Martin Harris was the 1895 team captain.

Schedule

References

Washington
Washington Huskies football seasons
College football undefeated seasons
Washington football